Blake Leeper (born August 31, 1989) is a United States Paralympic athlete, eight-time Paralympic Track and Field international medalist, world record holder and three-time American record holder.

Leeper started his medal run in 2011 at the Parapan American Games where he took silver in the 100-meter dash. He went on to compete in the 2012 Paralympic Games in London, where he picked up two more medals, a bronze in the 200-meter dash and silver in the 400-meter dash, losing to South African Oscar Pistorius, whose world record of 45.39 seconds is the one Leeper was chasing. In 2013, Leeper also took four medals at the Paralympic World Championships in Lyon, France, where he ran as part of the world record-setting 4x100-meter relay gold medal team. At the same event he took the silver medal in the 100-meter dash, 200-meter dash and 400-meter dash. Leeper's medal collection includes one gold, six silver and one bronze. Over his career, he hopes to win more medals than any Paralympic athlete in track and field. In addition to the medals he has already won, Leeper holds one 2013 Paralympic world record in the 4 × 100 m relay and three American records in the 100-meter dash (10.91), the 200-meter dash (21.7) and the 400-meter dash (44.42-Prague 2018). Leeper's world record for his part in the 4x100-meter relay still stands today. He served a one-year ban through June 2016 because he tested positive for cocaine. Leeper received official notification from the United States Olympic Committee's Paralympic Track and Field High Performance Director confirming his spot in the U.S. Paralympic Team Trials that commenced June 30 in Charlotte, North Carolina. The notification also recognized a one-year suspension agreement that Leeper and the U.S. Anti-Doping Agency (USADA) had previously entered into. With the official notification, Leeper stepped closer to his quest to break the 400-meter Paralympic world record set by Oscar Pistorius.
He has also set an example for many children and adults.
Blake Leeper completed a one-year suspension and set a new American record in the double-amputee (T43) 200-metre race with a time of 21.49 seconds at McMaster University Summer Twilight track series in Ontario Canada, June 21, 2016. He also set an American record in the 400-metre race with a time of 46.54 seconds.

Blake Leeper was chosen by the US Paralympics to represent Team USA in Rio 2016. At the Paralympic trials, he set a new American record in the 200m with a time of 21.5 and a new America's record in the 400m at 46.1.  He took silver in the 100m despite losing a prosthetic leg crossing the finish line live on NBC.

Biography
Blake Leeper was born in Kingsport, Tennessee with both legs missing below the knee, and has worn prosthetics since nine months of age. In his childhood, Blake participated in various sports, baseball, basketball etc. with his dad coaching. Blake credits his outstanding positive attitude to his family. He studies medicine at the University of Tennessee.

Leeper made his international debut in 2009 at Rio de Janeiro. In 2011 he won a silver medal in the World Championships 4 × 100 m Relay T42-46 classification with a time of 42.84. In the 2012 Paralympic Games, he won an individual silver medal in the 400 meter T44 event and a bronze medal in the 200m T44 event with a time of 22.46.

On Feb. 1, 2016, the U.S. Anti-Doping Agency announced that Leeper tested positive for benzoylecgonine from a sample collected on June 21, 2015, at the U.S. Paralympic Track & Field National Championships held in St. Paul, Minn. Benzoylecgonine is a metabolite of cocaine, a substance in the class of Stimulants prohibited under the USADA Protocol for Olympic and Paralympic Movement Testing and the International Paralympic Committee Anti-Doping Code, both of which have adopted the World Anti-Doping Code (“Code”) and the World Anti-Doping Agency Prohibited List. It was determined that Leeper's use of cocaine was not intended to enhance performance, and in consideration of other mitigating factors, he was deemed eligible for a reduced, one-year sanction.

Blake Leeper returned to the world of track and field at the U.S. Track & Field Championships in 2017, becoming the first double-leg amputee to compete at the event. After qualifying for semifinals with a time of 45.52 seconds in the 400m, Leeper was able to break Oscar Pistorius' world record in the event with a time of 45.25 seconds the next day. This time bested the previous record of 45.39 seconds.

On 2019, Leeper made an appearance as a contestant on the fourth episode of the first season of Netflix's Awake. He made it until the last round, winning a prize of $191,011.25, leaving the competition right before the million dollar Buyout, his count being off by $373.50.

Leeper also appeared on the Jan. 4, 2021, edition of Let’s Make a Deal in which he competed in the game “0 to 80” for a chance to win a new car. Leeper was unsuccessful in his quest to win the car, instead leaving with $50 from host Wayne Brady.

Prosthetics
World Athletics formed The Mechanical Aids Review Panel in January 2021 to research the passive-elastic carbon-fibre running specific prostheses Leeper wears in competition.  The report found the devices gave Leeper a leg length of 104cm and a standing height of 184cm, almost 10cm above the Maximum Allowable Standing Height established for paralympic athletes.  The report found that "there is a direct relationship between leg length and running speed."  "The only conclusion that is open is that Mr Leeper is running unnaturally tall in using his new RSPs."  On April 26, 2021, it was ruled Leeper cannot compete in major World Athletics meets or the Paralympics in the RSPs.  He can wear them in other International Competitions although his results will be listed separately and not recognized.

See also
The Mechanics of Running Blades

References

1989 births
Living people
Paralympic track and field athletes of the United States
Athletes (track and field) at the 2012 Summer Paralympics
Paralympic bronze medalists for the United States
Paralympic silver medalists for the United States
American male sprinters
World record holders in Paralympic athletics
Medalists at the 2012 Summer Paralympics
Paralympic medalists in athletics (track and field)
Medalists at the 2011 Parapan American Games